Alida Chen (born 29 March 1996) is a Dutch badminton player. She won the 2009 Netherlands national championships U13 in girls' singles, doubles and mixed doubles, 2011 U15 in girls' singles, doubles and mixed doubles, 2012 U17 in girls' singles, doubles and mixed doubles, and 2013 U17 in mixed doubles. She became a quarter finalist at the 2014 Youth Olympic Games in mixed doubles event.

Personal life 
Chen graduated with a master's degree of neurosciences at the Radboud University, and is currently pursuing a PhD in neuroimmunology at the Netherlands Institute for Neuroscience.

Achievements

BWF International Challenge/Series 
Women's doubles

  BWF International Challenge tournament
  BWF International Series tournament
  BWF Future Series tournament

References

External links 
 Alida Chen Websites
 

1996 births
Living people
Dutch female badminton players
Badminton players at the 2014 Summer Youth Olympics
21st-century Dutch women